Wright is a city in Carlton County, Minnesota, United States. The population was 127 at the 2010 census.

Minnesota State Highway 210 serves as a main route in Wright.

Wright is located 28 miles west of Cloquet.  Wright is located 6 miles west of Cromwell; and 47 miles west-southwest of Duluth.

History
A post office called Wright has been in operation since 1892. The city was named for George Burdick Wright, a land agent.

Geography

The boundary line between Carlton and Aitkin counties is nearby. The boundary line between Carlton and Saint Louis counties is also near Wright.

Festival

There is an annual festival called "Wrong Days in Wright" on the third weekend in July.

The festival includes:
Steak fry, fireworks and teen dance on Friday.
Parade, smorgasbord, mixed doubles softball tournament, horseshoe tournament, craft show, and adult dance on Saturday.
Pancake breakfast on Sunday morning.

Demographics

2010 census
As of the census of 2010, there were 127 people, 52 households, and 33 families living in the city. The racial makeup of the city was 97.6% White, 0.8% Native American, 0.8% Asian, and 0.8% from two or more races.

There were 52 households, of which 40.4% had children under the age of 18 living with them, 55.8% were married couples living together, 3.8% had a female householder with no husband present, 3.8% had a male householder with no wife present, and 36.5% were non-families. 32.7% of all households were made up of individuals, and 15.4% had someone living alone who was 65 years of age or older. The average household size was 2.44 and the average family size was 3.06.

The median age in the city was 37.5 years. 26.8% of residents were under the age of 18; 5.5% were between the ages of 18 and 24; 26.7% were from 25 to 44; 28.3% were from 45 to 64; and 12.6% were 65 years of age or older. The gender makeup of the city was 52.8% male and 47.2% female.

2000 census
As of the census of 2000, there were 93 people, 42 households, and 21 families living in the city. The racial makeup of the city was 98.92% White and 1.08% from two or more races. 23.7% were of German, 22.6% Swedish, 15.1% Finnish, 8.6% Irish and 7.5% Lithuanian ancestry.

There were 42 households, out of which 23.8% had children under the age of 18 living with them, 38.1% were married couples living together, 7.1% had a female householder with no husband present, and 50.0% were non-families. 42.9% of all households were made up of individuals, and 28.6% had someone living alone who was 65 years of age or older. The average household size was 2.21 and the average family size was 3.10.

In the city, the population was spread out, with 22.6% under the age of 18, 7.5% from 18 to 24, 24.7% from 25 to 44, 19.4% from 45 to 64, and 25.8% who were 65 years of age or older. The median age was 40 years. For every 100 females, there were 89.8 males. For every 100 females age 18 and over, there were 89.5 males.

The median income for a household in the city was $39,375, and the median income for a family was $42,188. Males had a median income of $26,250 versus $18,750 for females. The per capita income for the city was $14,715. None of the families and 3.6% of the population were below the poverty line. Out of the total people living in poverty, 0.0% are under the age of 18 and 11.1% are 65 or older.

References

Cities in Carlton County, Minnesota
Cities in Minnesota